Lieutenant-General Emanuel Scrope Howe (c. 1663 – 26 September 1709), of The Great Lodge, Alice Holt Forest, Hampshire, was an English diplomat, army officer, and Member of Parliament.

Life
He was the fourth son of John Grubham Howe (1625–1679) of Langar Hall in Nottinghamshire, the younger son of Sir John Howe, 1st Baronet. His older brother, Scrope Howe, 1st Viscount Howe, was a prominent Whig politician, raised to the peerage in 1701. Emanuel Howe was appointed a Groom of the Bedchamber in 1689 as reward for his support for William III, and held the office throughout the king's reign. Howe was also given a commission in the 1st Foot Guards, and served in Flanders where he was wounded at the 1695 Siege of Namur. He purchased a colonelcy in 1695, and was Colonel of the 15th Regiment of Foot until his death. He was promoted to Brigadier-General in 1704, Major-General in 1707 and Lieutenant-General in the year of his death, 1709. He was First Commissioner of Prizes from 1703 to 1705, and envoy-extraordinary to the Elector of Hanover between 1705 and 1709, successfully overcoming the strained relations between the English and Hanoverian reigning families to keep Hanover in the Grand Alliance.

He entered Parliament in 1701 as member for Morpeth, elected as a placeman on the Earl of Carlisle's interest to support the Court Whigs, and in 1705 also represented Wigan. He is recorded as taking part in only one debate.

Ranger of the Royal Forest of Alice Holt

He married Ruperta Howe, the natural daughter of Prince Rupert of the Rhine, in 1695. They were jointly appointed "Rangers of Alice Holt Forest" from 1699 onwards, a grace-and-favour sinecure. They had three sons and two daughters. After Howe's death, Ruperta continued as "Ranger of the Holt" until 1740.

Scrope-Howe was not pleased when, having spent £1,200 on repairs to the Great Lodge as requested by King William, the King repeatedly refused to repay him.

He attempted some ambitious re-introductions in the Forest, including wild boar and, moving beyond simple re-introductions, even buffalo, but these succumbed to the poaching which was endemic in Alice Holt and neighbouring Woolmer Forest at the time. Ruperta planted an oak tree near the Lodge in memory of her late father, Prince Rupert, which was replaced in the 1960s by a memorial stone. The present Lodge building dates from the 1810s but stands on the site of the Great Lodge occupied by Emanuel and Ruperta.

Notes

References 
 
 David W Hayton, Stuart Handley and Eveline Cruickshanks, The History of Parliament: the House of Commons 1690–1715 (Cambridge: Cambridge University Press, 2002)
 Robert Walcott, English Politics in the Early Eighteenth Century (Oxford: Oxford University Press, 1956)

External links
 
 History of Parliament online http://www.historyofparliamentonline.org/volume/1690-1715/member/howe-emanuel-scrope-1663-1709

1660s births
1709 deaths
East Yorkshire Regiment officers
Members of the Parliament of Great Britain for English constituencies
British Army lieutenant generals
British military personnel of the Nine Years' War
English MPs 1701–1702
English MPs 1702–1705
English MPs 1705–1707
British MPs 1707–1708